Valley View is a city in Cooke County, Texas, United States. Its population was 757 at the 2010 census.

History

The town was first settled in 1870 by the Lee family. L.W. Lee plotted a town on his land in 1872, naming it "Valley View", presumably for the view offered at the site of Spring Creek valley. Eighteen families moved in, and a post office opened in the community that same year.
 
A blacksmith shop was opened in 1873, and the shop was used for the community's first school. By 1884, the town had an estimated 250 inhabitants, three steam gristmills and cotton gins, and three general stores, and it shipped cotton, livestock, and wheat. 
The Gulf, Colorado and Santa Fe Railway (now the BNSF Railway) reached the town in 1886. Valley View had four church buildings and a hotel by 1890, and the Valley View Independent School District was incorporated in 1902. In 1903, the town witnessed dramatic growth with the completion of a two-story brick school house and six brick business buildings, the arrival of telephone service, and the opening of a bank. The following year the Valley View News began publishing weekly. The community had an estimated population of 600 by 1914.

Two fires struck the town in 1924. In the fall, the east side of the town square was burned down. On the morning of December 19, bank robbers started a second fire as they robbed the First National Bank (later named the Valley View National Bank and was owned by Thomas R. Couch) of $5,000. A further two city blocks were destroyed.  

Valley View's population was estimated at 700 from the 1920s through the mid-1960s. In 1970, it was 805, but the town declined during the next decade. When Valley View formally incorporated in 1980, it had 514 inhabitants and six businesses. The town began to grow again in the 1980s and had a population of 640 in 1990.

John Marvin Jones, a member of the U.S. House of Representatives from 1916 to 1940 and later chief judge of the federal Court of Claims, was born in Valley View.

Geography

Valley View is located in southern Cooke County at  (33.493656, –97.164403). Interstate 35/U.S. Route 77 passes just east of the center of town, with access from exits 485 through 487. The highway leads north  to Gainesville, the county seat, and south  to Denton.

Climate

The climate in this area is characterized by hot, humid summers and generally mild to cool winters.  According to the Köppen climate classification, Valley View has a humid subtropical climate, Cfa on climate maps.

Demographics

2020 census

As of the 2020 United States census, there were 737 people, 290 households, and 206 families residing in the city.

2000 census
As of the census of 2000, 737 people, 270 households, and 216 families were residing in the town. The population density was 319.0 people per square mile (123.2/km). The 292 housing units had an average density of 126.4 per square mile (48.8/km). The racial makeup of the town was 97.01% White, 0.27% African American, 0.14% Native American, 0.81% Asian, 1.22% from other races, and 0.54% from two or more races. Hispanics or Latinos of any race were 3.39% of the population.

Of the 270 households,  38.5% had children younger than 18 living with them, 62.6% were married couples living together, 14.8% had a female householder with no husband present, and 20.0% were not families. About 17.8% of all households were made up of individuals, and 7.8% had someone living alone who was 65 or older. The average household size was 2.73, and the average family size was 3.10.

In the town, the age distribution was 29.7% younger than 18, 8.0% from 18 to 24, 30.0% from 25 to 44, 21.8% from 45 to 64, and 10.4% who were 65 or older. The median age was 34 years. For every 100 females, there were 91.9 males. For every 100 females 18 and older, there were 84.3 males.

The median income for a household in the town was $48,500, and for a family was $51,875. Males had a median income of $39,167 versus $24,107 for females. The per capita income for the town was $18,204. About 7.9% of families and 10.0% of the population were below the poverty line, including 14.4% of those younger than age 18 and 4.3% of those age 65 or older.

Education 

Valley View is served by the Valley View Independent School District. The district was incorporated in 1902. A two-story brick school was built in 1902–1903. A larger school was built in 1938, which is still in use as part of the elementary campus. It has been renovated to restore the original features of the building.

The district grew during the time of school consolidation in the early to mid-1900s. Local schools such as John's Branch, Lone Oak, Elm Grove, Lois, Burns City, and Mountain Springs became part of the Valley View ISD.

The VVISD served about 650 students on three connected campuses, as of 2007.

Government 
The town voted to incorporate in 1979. The city is a type A general law city, and is served by a volunteer mayor and five aldermen.

Sources of revenue are sales tax, ad valorem tax, and franchise fees. The city employs a municipal judge, city secretary, city/municipal court clerk, police officer, and city attorney.

In 1993, the board of aldermen voted to borrow money from the Greater Texoma Utility Authority to build a wastewater treatment plant. The city was expected to pay $2,400 per month until April 2013. The city is in negotiations with Bolivar Water Supply Company to purchase the utilities in the city limits.

The city's extraterritorial jurisdiction is half a mile outside the city limits.

Business and community 

Sports events play a large role in the community. The varsity football team was the state champion in 1980. The girls' varsity basketball team was 1-A state runner-up in 1999 and 2000. In 2005, the varsity football team won the 16-A district championship. The football team has also won the bi-district title for the 2015–2017 years. The boys' cross country team won the state championship in 2014 and 2015, and placed third at the state meet in 2017 and 2018. The boys' track team placed third at the state track meet in 2018.

The Valley View Area Chamber of Commerce was organized in 1997. Three restaurants are in Valley View: Avalanche Bay (pizza and snow cones), York ‘n’ Ale (burgers), and a Dairy Queen franchise. Whiskey Hollow distillery and Firelight Vineyards wine tasting room are located on the downtown square along with the Rustic Ranch Furniture Co. The major businesses in town are a trucking company hub and the Martindale Feed Mill, both owned by Alan Ritchey, Inc. First State Bank of Gainesville has a branch near Interstate 35. A motel was opened in early 2008.

Six churches are within the city limits of Valley View: First Baptist Church (Southern Baptist), Church of Christ (Churches of Christ), Cornerstone Baptist Church (Southern Baptist), St. John's Catholic Church (Roman Catholic), Methodist Church (United Methodist), and Christian Gathering (independent Pentecostal).

The town has a chapter of Keep Texas Beautiful, which was named first-place winner in the 2006 Governor's Community Achievement Awards and received $60,000. The money was earmarked for renovations to the downtown square.

In popular culture 
The Disney TV series, The Villains of Valley View, is set in Valley View.

References

Further reading
 A. Morton Smith, The First 100 Years in Cooke County (San Antonio: Naylor, 1955)
 Gainesville Daily Register (Gainesville, Texas, various editions)

External links
 City of Valley View official website
 Handbook of Texas Online
 Valley View history

Cities in Cooke County, Texas
Cities in Texas